Work for All is a studio album from Juluka, a South African band led by Johnny Clegg and Sipho Mchunu. It was first released in 1983 and rapidly achieved major success in South Africa where it is now remembered as a classic album in the history of South African music.

While Clegg is known for the socio-political bent of his lyrics, Work for All is known to be his most directly political album in the Juluka period. At the time that it was composed he was working closely with the trade union movement.

Track listing 
All tracks composed by Johnny Clegg
 "December African Rain" – 4:20
 "Bullets for Bafazane" – 3:53
 "Mana Lapho" – 3:52
 "Baba Nango" – 3:46
 "Walima 'Mabele" – 4:17
 "Work For All" – 3:56
 "Gunship Ghetto" – 3:42
 "Woza Moya" – 3:34
 "Mdantsane (Mud Coloured Dusty Blood)" – 3:56
 "Mantombana" – 3:40

Total: 39:28

Personnel
 Johnny Clegg - vocals, guitar
 Sipho Mchunu - guitar, percussion, vocals
 Gary Van Zyl - bass guitar, percussion, vocals
 Zola Mtiya - drums, percussion, vocals
 Tim Hoare - keyboards, vocals
 Scorpion Madondo - flute, saxophone, vocals

References

External links
 Work For All - on the Juluka website

Juluka albums
1983 albums